Christopher John Bernard Sze (born 9 December 2003) is an English professional footballer who plays as a midfielder for EFL Championship side Wigan Athletic.

Career
Sze first joined Wigan Athletic at under-12s level from Liverpool Schoolboys. He signed his first professional contract with the club on 21 September 2021. He then made his first team debut later that day, appearing as an substitute against Sunderland in the EFL Cup.

In November 2021, Sze scored his first senior goal for the club in a 2–0 win against Shrewsbury Town in the EFL Trophy.

References

External links
 

2003 births
Living people
English footballers
Association football midfielders
Wigan Athletic F.C. players
English Football League players